Emanuel Gularte Méndez (born 30 September 1997) is a Uruguayan professional footballer who plays as a defender for Liga MX club Puebla.

References

External links

1997 births
Living people
Uruguayan footballers
Uruguay youth international footballers
Association football defenders
Uruguayan Primera División players
Liga MX players
Montevideo Wanderers F.C. players
C.A. Progreso players
Club Puebla players
Uruguayan expatriate sportspeople in Mexico
Expatriate footballers in Mexico